The 1995–96 season was the 107th season in existence for Sheffield United, during which they played in Division One for the second successive season. In the first half of the season, events in the boardroom overshadowed those on the pitch until Mike McDonald completed a successful take over of the club. Following his arrival, manager Dave Bassett resigned and was replaced by Howard Kendall, who was provided with the funds to overhaul the squad. Many changes were made to the playing squad over the following months, meaning the club used more first-team players in one season than ever before. Although struggling for much of the season, the new arrivals brought about a late rally and the club finished a respectable ninth in the division.

Players

First-team squad

League table

References

Notes

Sheffield United
Sheffield United F.C. seasons